De Imperatoribus Romanis (DIR) is an online peer-reviewed encyclopedia about the emperors of the Roman Empire, including the Byzantine Empire. It was established in 1996 by Michael DiMaio, and hosted at Salve Regina University. 

The Cambridge Companion to the Age of Constantine says it "offer[s] sound overviews and a regularly updated bibliography".

References

External links 
 Original website (Archive)
 Second website (Archive)

Internet properties established in 1996
American online encyclopedias
Byzantine studies
Prosopography of ancient Rome